Fernana is a town and commune in the Jendouba Governorate about 170 km from Tunis, Tunisia. In 2006 the municipal center of the commune had a population of 3206. It is now estimated to more than 5000 inhabitants. The whole commune has about 50,000 inhabitants (52,690 in 2006). Most inhabitants work in agriculture, particularly in tobacco farming.

See also
List of cities in Tunisia

References

Populated places in Jendouba Governorate
Communes of Tunisia
Tunisia geography articles needing translation from French Wikipedia